Banco de Crédito de Bolivia (abbreviated as BCP) is a banking and financial services company located in Bolivia. It is headquartered in La Paz and is a wholly owned international subsidiary of Banco de Crédito del Perú, Peru's largest bank. BCP Bolivia started its operations in the country following BCP's acquisition of the Bolivian bank Banco Popular. BCP Bolivia provides its products and services through operating 102 branches, 240 ATMs, call centers, and online and mobile banking platforms. Banco de Crédito de Bolivia is currently Bolivia's fourth largest bank by total assets.

History

Acquisition of Banco Popular
In 1994, Banco de Crédito del Perú acquired the Bolivian bank "Banco Popular" and renamed it to Banco de Crédito de Bolivia S.A.. The acquisition of Banco Popular allowed Banco de Crédito del Perú to begin businesses and operations in Bolivia. BCP Bolivia became a wholly owned subsidiary of Bance de Crédito del Perú.

Acquisition of Banco de La Paz
In 1998,  Banco de Crédito del Perú announced its intentions to acquire the Bolivian bank "Banco de La Paz", through its subsidiary BCP Bolivia. The acquisition of the bank further expanded the bank's presence in Bolivia and added a significant number of branches in other regions of the country.

In 1999, BCP Bolivia announced the acquisition of the bankrupt "Banco Boliviano Americano". BCP Bolivia acquired the bank's operations and its headquarter buildings.

Operations

Personal banking
BCP Bolivia's personal banking division serves customer individuals, business individuals and small businesses. This financial product was composed of the following areas:
Retail banking: Offers Transactional accounts, savings accounts, debit cards, credit cards, mortgages and personal loans.
Business banking: Offers business bank accounts, savings, mortgages and loans.

Credibolsa
Credibolsa is a subsidiary of BCP Bolivia that provides financial advisory services and brokerage in the Bolivian stock market for the buying and selling of long-term debt or equity-backed securities. It also provides financial consulting and offers investment management among other services.

Corporate affairs

Board of directors
 *Dionisio Romero Paoletti (Chairman)

 *Walter Bayly Llona (Vicepresident)

 *Jorge Mujica Gianoli (General manager)

Shareholders

Avion Pirata
One of the bank's branches was once located inside a famous airplane, the local legend Avion Pirata.

References

Banks of Bolivia
Banks established in 1994
Bolivian brands
Bolivian companies established in 1994